The 2016 Welwyn Hatfield Borough Council election took place on 5 May 2016 to elect members of Welwyn Hatfield Borough Council in England. This was on the same day as other local elections.

Results Summary

Ward results

Brookmans Park and Little Heath

Haldens

Handside

Hatfield Central

Hatfield East

Hatfield South West

Hatfield Villages

Hollybush

Howlands

Northaw and Cuffley

Panshanger

Peartree

Sherrards

Welham Green and Hatfield South

Welwyn East

Welwyn West

By-Elections

Haldens
A by-election was held on 17 November 2016 following the resignation of Malcolm Spinks.

Panshanger
A by-election was held on 4 May 2017 following the resignation of Martyn Levitt.

Hatfield Villages
A by-election was held on 8 June 2017 following the death of Howard Morgan.

Handside
A by-election was held on 14 December 2017 following the resignation of Rachel Basch.

References

2016 English local elections
2016
2010s in Hertfordshire